The 2008–09 season of the División de Honor de Futsal is the 20th season of top-tier futsal in Spain.

Regular season table

Championship playoffs

The Finals were broadcast in Spain on RTVE.

Matches

Quarter-finals
(8) MRA Navarra vs. (1) ElPozo Murcia Turística:
Game 1 15 May @ Pamplona: MRA Navarra 3-8 ElPozo Murcia Turística
Game 2 22 May @ Murcia: ElPozo Murcia Turística 6-2 MRA Navarra
ElPozo Murcia Turística wins the series 2–0
Total Aggregate: 5–14

(7) Caja Segovia vs. (2) Interviú Movistar:
Game 1 16 May @ Segovia: Caja Segovia 3-3 Interviú Movistar / Pen:6–5
Game 2 23 May @ Alcalá de Henares: Interviú Movistar 4-2 Caja Segovia
Game 3 24 May @ Alcalá de Henares: Interviú Movistar 3-3 Caja Segovia / Pen:5–4
Interviú Movistar wins the series 2–1
Total Aggregate: 8–10

(6) Tien21 P. Millenium Pinto vs. (3) FC Barcelona Mobicat:
Game 1 17 May @ Pinto: Tien21 P. Millenium Pinto 6-4 FC Barcelona Mobicat
Game 2 22 May @ Barcelona: FC Barcelona Mobicat 2-4 Tien21 P. Millenium Pinto
Tien21 P. Millenium Pinto wins the series 2–0
Total Aggregate: 10–6

(5) Benicarló Aeroport Castelló vs. (4) Lobelle de Santiago:
Game 1 15 May @ Benicarló: Benicarló Aeroport Castelló 1-3 Lobelle de Santiago
Game 2 22 May @ Santiago de Compostela: Lobelle de Santiago 3-4 Benicarló Aeroport Castelló
Game 3 23 May @ Santiago de Compostela: Lobelle de Santiago 5-2 Benicarló Aeroport Castelló
Lobelle de Santiago wins the series 2–1
Total Aggregate: 7–11

Semifinals
(4) Lobelle de Santiago vs. (1) ElPozo Murcia Turística:
Game 1 30 May @ Santiago de Compostela: Lobelle de Santiago 3-4 ElPozo Murcia Turística
Game 2 5 June @ Murcia: ElPozo Murcia Turística 8-5 Lobelle de Santiago
ElPozo Murcia Turística wins the series 1–0
Total Aggregate: 8–12

(6) Tien21 P. Millenium Pinto vs. (2) Interviú Movistar:
Game 1 29 May @ Pinto: Tien21 P. Millenium Pinto 5-6 Interviú Movistar
Game 2 5 June @ Alcalá de Henares: Interviú Movistar 1-2 Tien21 P. Millenium Pinto
Game 3 6 June @ Alcalá de Henares: Interviú Movistar 4-3 Tien21 P. Millenium Pinto
Interviú Movistar wins the series 2–1
Total Aggregate: 10–11

Final
(2) Interviú Movistar vs. (1) ElPozo Murcia Turística:
Game 1 12 June @ Alcalá de Henares: Interviú Movistar 2-3 ElPozo Murcia Turística
Game 2 19 June @ Murcia: ElPozo Murcia Turística 7-2 Interviú Movistar
ElPozo Murcia Turística wins the series 2–0
Total Aggregate: 4–10
CHAMPION: : ElPozo Murcia Turística

Top goal scorers

As day 30 of 30

TV Coverage
TVE2
Teledeporte
Barça TV
Punt 2
Canal 33
TVG

External links
2008–09 season at lnfs.es

See also
2008–09 División de Plata de Futsal
División de Honor de Futsal
Futsal in Spain

2008 09
1
futsal1
Spain